The Howrah–New Delhi Rajdhani Express (via Gaya) (also known as Kolkata Rajdhani Express) is a Rajdhani-class train of Indian Railways connects the capital of West Bengal, Cultural Capital of India, capital before the British Kolkata to the National Capital of India, New Delhi through Howrah. The Howrah Rajdhani is the first Rajdhani Express of India and is one of the fastest train of Indian Railways. It is the fastest railway connection from New Delhi to Kolkata and vice versa . It is hauled by a Howrah based WAP 7 end to end.

History 

From 1965 onward Ministry of Railways (India) was looking for options to reduce the time travel between important destinations by implementing new technology. Hence for that very purpose the Howrah–Delhi main line was chosen for the trials owing to its technological superiority in terms of feasibility and others. Thus finally in the Railway Budget of 1969–70, an introduction of a new superfast train was announced which would connect Delhi to Kolkata in less than 18 hours, because until then the fastest trains between these two cities usually took more than 20 hours.

Thus, on 1 March 1969 the first Rajdhani Express left from New Delhi to Howrah at 1730 hrs and arrived at its destination at 1050 hrs on the next day, completing 1450 km in a record time of 17 hours 20 minutes. The honor of hauling the first Rajdhani was done by the WDM-4 class locomotive of Indian Railways. The return Rajdhani Express left Howrah Junction on 3 March 1969 at 1700 hrs and arrived at New Delhi on its next day at 1020 hrs. The maximum permissible speed of the Howrah Rajdhani Express was kept 120 km/hr for safety reasons, thus making it the fastest train of India at that point of time. The first train carried nine coaches, which were one Dining Car, one AC First Class, five AC Chair Car and two Generator/Power Car. The price of at that time was set at Rs. 280 for the AC First Class and Rs. 90 for AC Chair Car respectively. The coaches were specially designed and developed by Integral Coach Factory Perambur and had one of its kind vacuum brakes and under-slung air conditioning systems. Additionally the AC First Class was of 3 Cabin+ 3 Coupe model while the AC Chair Car was of 2 x 2 seating model. At that time the train use to ply only on Monday and Friday respectively from both the ends and had stoppages at Kanpur Central railway station, Mughalsarai Junction railway station and Netaji Subhas Chandra Bose Gomoh railway station only.

On 1 November 1971 the speed was upgraded to 130 km/hr, thus reducing the time of journey by 25 min from both the ends. At that time the train was hauled by twin WDM-4S locomotive from Mughalsarai Shed of Indian Railways. In 1983, the Research Design and Standards Organisation in association with Chittaranjan Locomotive Works manufactured the 3900 HP WAP-1 class locomotive exclusively for Howrah Rajdhani Express. And with the introduction of the WAP-1  class locomotive, the train length was increased to 18 coaches, by adding additional AC Two Tier Coaches. Incidentally the locomotives were painted in the same livery as that of the Howrah Rajdhani Express. On the very same year i.e. on 1 April 1983 owing to the high popularity and huge demand the frequency of the Howrah Rajdhani (via Gaya) was increased to 4 days a week, then to 5 days a week from 1 October 1983 and finally to present 6 days a week from 19 May 2003. In 1992, the coaches were again redeveloped, and the Under-slung Air Conditioning System was replaced by Roof Mounted Air Condition Package Unit (RMPU), thus becoming the only train to have it at that point of time. In 1993, Air Conditioned 3 Tier coaches were added in the train and of 1 August 1993 another service via Patna Junction railway station was also introduced from Howrah on Sunday and from New Delhi on Friday respectively.

On 3 February 2006, both the pairs of Howrah Rajdhani Express were upgraded to the LHB coaches, thus paving the way for the replacement and the end of the glorious era of the ICF coaches of Rajdhani Express. While on 2 April 2013, WiFi service was introduced in the train, thus making it the only train of Indian Railways to have WiFi facility in a moving train. And finally on 23 December 2017, the train was upgraded to the Swarna Standards of Indian Railways, laced with modern amenities and facilities for the passengers.

Speed (via Gaya)
The maximum permissible speed of the train is up to 130 kmph except some parts. Its all coaches are of air conditioned LHB coach type which is capable of reaching 160 kmph but it does not touch. Sometimes people become confused because according to Indian Railways Permanent Way Manual (IRPWM) on Indian Railways website or Indian Railway Institute of Civil Engineering website, the BG (Broad Gauge) lines have been classified into six groups ‘A’ to ‘E’ on the basis of the future maximum permissible speeds but it may not be same as present speed.

The maximum permissible speed is 130 kmph except two small parts – 29 km long New Delhi  (NDLS) –   Chipyana Buzurg (CPYZ) part where Railway is trying to raise maximum permissible sectional speed to 130 kmph from 110 kmph  and Gurpa – Gujhandi part near Koderma. Gurpa (Gaya end) – Gujhandi (Dhanbad end) is a 22 km long Ghat section  where trains pass through at a maximum permissible speed of 80 kmph – inside tunnels at restricted speed of 65 kmph. The trains also touch the speed of 100 kmph in a short stretch of approximately 03 km distance. You may get details of this ghat (hill) section in a post on 11 July 2019 in the Facebook profile of East Central Railway.

Railway Board has approved the speed policy which envisages operation of passenger trains at 160 kmph on Delhi–Howrah route but it is still unclear what will its impact on this train in future like increasing of speed but not up to 160 kmph or up to 160 kmph.

Route and halts 

The important halts of the train are:

 
 
 
 
 
Pt. Deen Dayal Upadhyaya Junction

See also

 Express trains in India
 List of named passenger trains of India
 Howrah–Delhi main line
 Sealdah Rajdhani Express

References

External links
 Times of India article

Trains from Howrah Junction railway station
Delhi–Kolkata trains
Rajdhani Express trains
Rail transport in Jharkhand
Rail transport in Bihar
Rail transport in Uttar Pradesh
Railway services introduced in 1969
Rail transport in Delhi
Rail transport in West Bengal